Lajna is a Czech web series written by Petr Kolečko and directed by Vladimír Skórka. Obbod TV produced first season. The second seasonwas produced by TV Seznam. The third season was produced by TV Seznam and TV JOJ. The first season of the series has won the Best Online Series award at the Serial Killer festival. The series was renewed for fourth season produced by TV Seznam.

The main character is an ice hockey coach Hrouzek, a member of the winning team from Nagano with NHL playing experience, who is currently divorcing his wife and leaving to Havířov with his son Patrik, a talented ice hockey player, where he should train a local club.

Spin-off Luptákův vlogísek (Lupták's vlog) was filmed. It focuses on Igor Lupták. The series had 12 episodes. The script was written by Štěpán Kozub and Albert Čuba, and the director was Albert Čuba.

Cast
Jiří Langmajer as Luboš Hrouzek
Hana Vagnerová as Denisa
Zdeněk Piškula as Patrik Hrouzek

External links
Website (in Czech)
IMDb.com

References 

Czech comedy television series
2017 Czech television series debuts
Czech sports television series
TV Seznam original programming
Czech web series